This is a list of the members of the European Parliament for Portugal in the 2014 to 2019 session, ordered by name.

See 2014 European Parliament election in Portugal for further information on these elections in Portugal, and 2014 European Parliament election for discussion on likely changes to the Parliamentary Groups.

List 
This table can be sorted by name, party or party group: click on the symbol at the top of the appropriate column.

References

Portugal 2014-2019
List
2014